John Edmund Rudderham (1863–1942) was a Major League Baseball player.

Sources

Major League Baseball left fielders
Boston Reds (UA) players
Brockton (minor league baseball) players
Portsmouth Lillies players
Auburn Yankees players
Elmira Gladiators players
Lewiston (minor league baseball) players
Brockton Shoemakers players
Baseball players from Massachusetts
19th-century baseball players
1863 births
1942 deaths